Pseudozeuxidae is a family of crustaceans belonging to the order Tanaidacea.

Genera:
 Charbeitanais Bamber & Bird, 1997
 Haimormus Kakui & Fujita, 2018
 Pseudozeuxo Sieg, 1982

References

Tanaidacea